Illinoistown may refer to:

East St. Louis, Illinois
Colfax, California